The 2010 season was Buffalo Flash's second season of existence, and the second  in which they competed in the W-League, at the time the second division of women's soccer in the United States. This was the last year the Flash operated under the Buffalo name, they became the Western New York Flash when they moved on to Women's Professional Soccer in 2011.

Club

Current roster

Team management

Match results

Playoffs

Standings

Midwest Division

See also 
 2010 USL W-League season

References 

2010
Buffalo Flash
Buffalo Flash